Willie Casey (born 20 December 1981) is an Irish professional boxer who lives in Limerick, Ireland. He won the Prizefighter series in May 2010 in the super bantamweight division, defeating Mark Moran, Josh Wale and Paul McElhinney. He is nicknamed "Big Bang" for his aggressive and powerful boxing style.

Casey fought Paul Hyland at the University Arena in Limerick on 6 November 2010 for the European Super Bantamweight title which was previously held by Bernard Dunne. The original fight was supposed to be against Kiko Martinez who had held the title.
However Martinez vacated the title citing a "rib injury" as the problem. Casey won the fight and was crowned European Super Bantamweight champion.
On 2 February 2011 Casey was named Boxer of the Year at the Irish National Boxing Awards.
Casey was then offered a fight with WBA World Super Bantamweight Title Guillermo Rigondeaux by Rigondeaux's manager Gary Hyde. Casey accepted this fight, thus relinquishing his European Super Bantamweight Title. The fight on 19 March 2011 was stopped with 22 seconds left in the 1st round, with Rigondeaux retaining his title. Willie Casey had a comeback fight on 17 September 2011 against veteran Frenchman Daniel Kodjo Sassau at the Kings Hall, Belfast, Northern Ireland. In the 7th round Casey dropped Sassou with a straight left cross and went on to win the fight with an 8th-round TKO.

Professional boxing record

|- style="margin:0.5em auto; font-size:95%;"
| style="text-align:center;" colspan="8"|14 Wins (9 knockouts), 3 Losses, 0 Draws, 0 No Contests
|-  style="text-align:center; margin:0.5em auto; font-size:95%; background:#e3e3e3;"
|  style="border-style:none none solid solid; "|Res.
|  style="border-style:none none solid solid; "|Record
|  style="border-style:none none solid solid; "|Opponent
|  style="border-style:none none solid solid; "|Type
|  style="border-style:none none solid solid; "|Round
|  style="border-style:none none solid solid; "|Date
|  style="border-style:none none solid solid; "|Location
|  style="border-style:none none solid solid; "|Notes
|-
|Win|| 16-3|| George Gachechiladze||PTS||6(6)||6 September 2014||  Titanic Quarter, Belfast, Northern Ireland||
|-
|Win|| 15-3|| Krzysztof Rogowski||PTS||6(6)||20 June 2014|| Waterfront Hall, Belfast, Northern Ireland||
|-
|Loss|| 14-3|| Marco McCullough||TKO||9(12)||19 November 2013|| Odyssey Arena, Belfast, Northern Ireland||Irish Featherweight Title on the line.
|-
|Win|| 14-2|| Jason Booth||UD||12(12)||15 July 2012|| Stadium of Light, Sunderland, England||
|-
|Loss|| 13-2|| Andreas Evensen||MD||12(12)||21 April 2012|| Arena Nord, Frederikshavn, Denmark||
|-
|Win|| 13-1|| David Kanalas||TKO||1(8)||25 February 2012|| Emerald House, Belfast, Northern Ireland||
|-
|Win|| 12-1|| Daniel Kodjo Sassou||TKO||3(8)||17 September 2011|| Kings Hall, Belfast, Northern Ireland|| 
|-
|Loss||11-1|| Guillermo Rigondeaux||TKO||1(12)||19 September 2011|| Citywest Hotel, Dublin, Ireland||interim WBA World Super Bantamweight title on the line.
|-
|Win||11-0|| Paul Hyland||TKO||4(12)||6 November 2010|| University Arena, Limerick, Ireland||Won vacant EBU (European) Super Bantamweight title
|-
|Win||10-0|| Emiliano Salvini||PTS||8(8)||7 August 2010|| Citywest Hotel, Dublin, Ireland|| 
|-
|Win||9-0|| Faycal Messaoudene||TKO||5(6)||26 June 2010|| Neptune Sports Arena, Cork, Ireland|| 
|-
|Win||8-0|| Paul McElhinney||UD||3(3)||29 May 2010|| York Hall, Bethnal Green, London, UK||Prizefighter final.
|-
|Win||7-0|| Josh Wale||SD||3(3)||29 May 2010|| York Hall, Bethnal Green, London, UK||Prizefighter Semi-Final.  
|-
|Win||6-0|| Mark Moran||TKO||3(3)||29 May 2010|| York Hall, Bethnal Green, London, UK||Prizefighter Quarter-Final. 
|-
|Win||5-0|| Tyson Cave||TKO||8(8)||8 April 2010|| Royal York Hotel, Toronto, Ontario, Canada|| 
|-
|Win||4-0|| Fernando Guevara||TKO||1(6)||13 February 2010|| National Stadium, Dublin, Ireland|| 
|-
|Win||3-0|| Michael O'Gara||TKO||6(6)||14 November 2009|| University Arena, Limerick, Ireland|| 
|-
|Win|| 2-0|| Stoyan Serbezov||PTS||6(6)||24 October 2009|| National Stadium, Dublin, Ireland|| 
|-
|Win ||1-0|| Carlos De Jesus||TKO||2(4)||26 October 2008|| Gleneagle Hotel, Killarney, Ireland|| 
|}

References

External links

Willie Casey in 'Sports People' file at Limerick City Library, Ireland

Living people
1981 births
Sportspeople from Limerick (city)
Featherweight boxers
Prizefighter contestants
Irish male boxers